Lentipes is a genus of gobies native to fresh, marine and brackish waters of the Malay Archipelago and islands in the Pacific. Its species are typically from fast-flowing streams and some are anadromous.

Species
There are currently 18 recognized species in this genus:
 Lentipes adelphizonus R. E. Watson & Kottelat, 2006
 Lentipes argenteus Keith, Hadiaty & Lord, 2014 
 Lentipes armatus H. Sakai & M. Nakamura, 1979
 Lentipes caroline D. B. Lynch, Keith & Pezold, 2013 
 Lentipes concolor (T. N. Gill, 1860)
 Lentipes crittersius R. E. Watson & G. R. Allen, 1999
 Lentipes dimetrodon R. E. Watson & G. R. Allen, 1999
 Lentipes ikeae Keith, Hubert, Busson & Hadiaty, 2014 
 Lentipes kaaea R. E. Watson, Keith & Marquet, 2002 
 Lentipes kolobangara Keith, Lord, Boseto & Ebner, 2016 
 Lentipes mekonggaensis Keith & Hadiaty, 2014 
 Lentipes mindanaoensis I. S. Chen, 2004
 Lentipes multiradiatus G. R. Allen, 2001
 Lentipes niasensis Harefa & Chen, 2022
 Lentipes rubrofasciatus Maugé, Marquet & Laboute, 1992
 Lentipes solomonensis A. P. Jenkins, G. R. Allen & Boseto, 2008
 Lentipes venustus G. R. Allen, 2004
 Lentipes watsoni G. R. Allen, 1997
 Lentipes whittenorum R. E. Watson & Kottelat, 1994

References

 
Sicydiinae
Taxa named by Albert Günther
Taxonomy articles created by Polbot